Jamielee Randall is a Gibraltarian beauty pageant contestant who placed as 1st runner up at Miss Gibraltar 2013. Randall represented Gibraltar at Miss International 2013 in Japan where she became the first contestant from Gibraltar to place in the Top 15 in the pageant's history.

References

Living people
Miss International 2013 delegates
Year of birth missing (living people)